Hugo René Rodríguez Corona (born 14 March 1959) is a Mexican former football forward who played for Mexico in the 1978 FIFA World Cup. He also played for Club Santos Laguna.

References

External links
FIFA profile

1959 births
Mexican footballers
Mexico international footballers
Association football forwards
Santos Laguna footballers
Liga MX players
1978 FIFA World Cup players
Living people
Sportspeople from Torreón
Footballers from Coahuila